Nichols is an anglicised form of the Scottish surname relating to Clan MacNeacail, and may refer to:

A
Adam Nichols, British musician
Al Nichols, American baseball player
Allen Nichols, American football player
Anne Nichols, American playwright
Arthur Nichols, Australian politician
Arthur R. Nichols, Minnesota landscape architect
Austin Nichols, American actor

B
Beverley Nichols, English author, playwright, journalist, composer, and public speaker
Bilal Nichols, American football player
Bill Nichols (disambiguation), several people
Billy Nichols, American musician, member of B.T. Express
Brian Nichols (1971–present), accused Atlanta courthouse murderer

C
Charles Archibald Nichols (1876–1920), politician from the U.S. state of Michigan
Charles August Nichols (1910–1992), American animator and film director
Charles Augustus Nichols (1869–1953), better known as Kid Nichols, Major League Baseball pitcher and Hall of Famer
Charlotte Nichols, British Member of Parliament elected 2019
Clarina I. H. Nichols, journalist, lobbyist, and public speaker 
Clement Roy Nichols Scouts Australia Scouting notable, awardee of the Bronze Wolf in 1965

D
Dan Nichols, American Jewish rock musician.
Dandy Nichols (1907–1986), actor
Darlene Ka-Mook Nichols (born 1955), Native American activist and FBI informant
David A. Nichols (1917–1997), American judge
David C. Nichols (born 1950), American naval officer
David E. Nichols, American pharmacologist and medicinal chemist
David Eccles Nichols (1873–1962), English violist
David H. Nichols (1826–1900), American politician
Deatrick Nichols (born 1994), American football player
Dick Nichols (1926–2019), American politician
Don Nichols (1924–2017), American motorsport entrepreneur
Donald Nichols (American football) (1901–1978), American football player and lawyer
Donald Nichols (spy), American spy during and after the Korean War
Donald G. Nichols (born 1931), American politician
Dudley Nichols, (1895–1960), American screenwriter and director

E
Ernest Fox Nichols, physicist
Evan Nichols, American sled hockey player

G
George Nichols (disambiguation)
George Elwood Nichols (1882–1939), American botanist and ecologist
George Ward Nichols, American journalist
Grace Nichols, Guyanese poet

H
Herbie Nichols, American jazz composer
Horace Elmo Nichols – Chief Justice of the Georgia Supreme Court, from 1975 to 1980

J
Jack C. Nichols (1930–2007), American politician
James Nichols, convicted murderer
James P. Nichols, recording industry executive producer and master engineer
James W. Nichols (born 1946), American farmer and politician
Jennifer Nichols, gold medal Olympian archer
Jennifer Nichols, fictional character in the television show, The Brady Bunch
Jesse Clyde Nichols, American developer of commercial and residential real estate in Kansas City, Missouri
Joe Nichols, American country music artist
Johanna Nichols, professor emerita Linguist in the Department of Slavic Languages and Literatures at the University of California, Berkeley
John Nichols (disambiguation), one of several people including
John Nichols (journalist), American journalist and media activist
John Nichols, former member of the indie rock band Low
John Nichols (politician), 1800s American politician
John Nichols (printer) (1745–1826), English printer and author
John Bowyer Nichols (1779–1863), English printer and antiquary, son of the above
John Nichols (writer)
John B. Nichols (1931–2004), United States Navy aviator and author
John Bowyer Buchanan Nichols (1859–1939), known as Bowyer Nichols, was an English poet
John G. Nichols (1812–1898), businessman, builder, and politician
John Noel Nichols, inventor of Vimto cordial
John Treadwell Nichols (1883–1958), an American ichthyologist and ornithologist
Jonathan Nichols (Rhode Island politician) (1681–1727), colonial deputy governor of Rhode Island
Joy Nichols, Australian radio and stage performer
Joyce Nichols, American physicians assistant

K
Kathleen Nichols, American computer scientist and computer networking expert
Kelly Nichols, former pornographic actress
Keith Nichols (1945–2021), English jazz multi-instrumentalist and arranger
Kenneth Nichols, District Engineer of the Manhattan Project
Kid Nichols (1869–1953), Major League Baseball (MLB) pitcher who played for the Boston Beaneaters, St. Louis Cardinals and Philadelphia Phillies
Kyra Nichols, American ballet dancer and teacher, former New York City Ballet principal dancer

L
Lawrence T. Nichols, Professor of Sociology at West Virginia University
Larry D. Nichols, puzzle enthusiast and inventor

M
Malcolm Nichols, journalist and a U.S. political figure from a Boston Brahmin family
Marie Hochmuth Nichols, rhetorical critic
Marisol Nichols, American actress
Mark Nichols (disambiguation)
Mary Ann Nichols, Whitechapel murder victim killed by Jack the Ripper
Mike Nichols, Academy Award-winning film director
Mike J. Nichols, film editor
Minerva Parker Nichols, an early American female architect
Mitch Nichols, Australian footballer
Morris Nichols, called "Stan Nichols", leading all-rounder in English cricket for much of the 1930s
Moses Nichols, American physician, soldier, and leading citizen of Amherst, New Hampshire

N
Nathaniel B. Nichols (1914–1997), American control engineer
Nichelle Nichols (1932–2022), American singer and actor

P

Peter Nichols (playwright) (1927–2019), English writer

R
Rachel Nichols (actress)
Rachel Nichols (journalist)
Rayshad Nichols (born 1999), American football player
Rebecca S. Nichols (1819-1903), American poet
Red Nichols (1905–1965), jazz cornettist
Reid Nichols (1958 – ), American former Major League Baseball outfielder, now Farm Director/Director of Player Development for the Milwaukee Brewers
Robert Nichols (poet), English poet
Robert Nichols (Texas politician), Texas State Senator
Rob Nichols, American association executive and former public official
Robbie Nichols, American football player
Robbie Nichols (ice hockey), Canadian ice hockey player and coach
Roger Nichols (songwriter)
Roger Nichols (recording engineer)
Roy Nichols, American country music guitarist
Ross Nichols, Cambridge academic and published poet, artist and historian, who founded the Order of Bards, Ovates and Druids
Ruth Nichols, Canadian author
Ruth Rowland Nichols (1901–1960), aviator

S
Sam Nichols (1829–1913), Minnesota and Washington state politician
Sue C. Nichols, American artist
Stan Nichols, English cricketer
Stephen Nichols, American actor
Steve Nichols, American Formula One car engineer and designer

T
Taylor Nichols (1959–present), American actor
Ted Nichols (1929–present), American composer, conductor, arranger, educator, and minister of music
Terry Nichols (1955–present), convicted Oklahoma City bombing conspirator
Thomas Nichols (disambiguation), several people

V
Vincent Gerard Nichols, English cardinal of the Roman Catholic Church, Archbishop of Westminster and President of the Catholic Bishops' Conference of England and Wales

W
William Nichols (disambiguation), several people

Z
Zach Nichols, a fictional character in the television series Law & Order: Criminal Intent

Surnames
English-language surnames
Patronymic surnames
Surnames from given names

fr:Nichols